Gaël Liardon (18 December 1973 – 21 October 2018) was a Swiss classical keyboard player, composer and academic.

He has been organist of the church of Villamont, Lausanne, from 1995.

In 2009, he obtained a diploma of teaching theory at the Geneva University of Music, with distinction. He taught music pedagogy at the Geneva Conservatory.

In 1997, he created the Festival de Musique Improvisée de Lausanne and also participated in the creation of the research group on improvisation of the Schola Cantorum Basiliensis.

In 2011, he founded the Sweelinck Ensemble in Geneva.

References

External links 
 
 Festival de musique improvisée, Lausanne on RTS
 Gaël Liardon France-orgue
 Gaël Liardon IMSLP
 Gaël Liardon: Les psaumes de Didier Poncet (1611). Etude d'un style polyphonique hors norme. (thesis) 
 Enquête sur la disparition de l'improvisation au XVIIIe siècle by Gaël Liardon on Centre d'études supérieures de la Renaissance
 Gaël Liardon - Nun komm, der Heiden Heiland YouTube
 Gaël Liardon: Sonne der Gerechtigkeit IMLSP

1973 births
People from Lausanne
2018 deaths
Swiss harpsichordists
Swiss organists
Swiss male musicians
Male classical organists
Organ improvisers
20th-century organists
21st-century organists
20th-century Swiss musicians
21st-century Swiss musicians
20th-century male musicians
21st-century male musicians
20th-century classical musicians